Orum is an unincorporated community in Washington County, Nebraska, United States.

History
A post office was established at Orum in 1890, and remained in operation until it was discontinued in 1902.

References

Unincorporated communities in Washington County, Nebraska
Unincorporated communities in Nebraska